Stephen C. Gregory (born January 8, 1983) is an American football coach and a former safety. He was signed by the San Diego Chargers as an undrafted free agent in 2006. He played college football and coached at Syracuse. Gregory was also a member of the New England Patriots and Kansas City Chiefs.

Early years
Gregory lived in Staten Island, New York for most of his youth. He was a Jets fan growing up. He attended St. Margaret Mary Parochial Elementary school grades 6-8 then attended Monsignor Farrell High School before transferring to Curtis High School. He played college football at Syracuse University.

Professional career

San Diego Chargers
The defender started his career as an undrafted free agent, and signed with the San Diego Chargers as an undrafted free agent in 2006. He played for them until 2011. He started 31 of 85 games, recording 241 tackles, four interceptions and two sacks.

New England Patriots
On March 15, 2012, Gregory signed with the New England Patriots.
On Thanksgiving Night—November 22, 2012—Gregory had a primary role in the Patriots' victory over his home-town team, the New York Jets.  In the game, Gregory had an interception, 2 recovered fumbles (one leading to a touchdown, during the now infamous butt fumble play), 5 tackles, and 1 pass deflection.  At the end of the game, on the national NBC broadcast, Gregory was awarded the traditional Thanksgiving award, along with teammates Tom Brady and Vince Wilfork.

Between 2012 and 2014, he started 23 games for the New England Patriots. Gregory was released by the Patriots on February 28, 2014.

Kansas City Chiefs and retirement
Gregory was signed by the Kansas City Chiefs on July 31, 2014. Gregory announced his retirement from football on August 9, 2014. He cited the birth of his daughter with his wife Rosanne as giving him a new perspective on life, with plans to coach. He ended his career with 357 tackles, seven interceptions, 25 defensed passes, three sacks and two touchdowns, out of 111 NFL games.

Coaching career
On June 4, 2015, the Syracuse athletic department announced Gregory would return to his alma mater as a special teams quality control coach.

Detroit Lions
Two years after his year coaching at Syracuse, Gregory joined the Detroit Lions as a defensive assistant. He was promoted to defensive backs coach in 2020, and he missed the team's week 16 game against the Tampa Bay Buccaneers due to COVID-19 protocols.

Miami Dolphins
In 2021, Gregory joined the Dolphins as a defensive assistant, where he would reunite with Dolphins head coach Brian Flores, whom coached Gregory with the New England Patriots where Flores was his Safeties coach. In 2022, he was retained by Mike McDaniel and was promoted to the Dolphins safeties coach. He was fired on January 19, 2023.

NFL career statistics

References

External links
New England Patriots bio
Syracuse Orange bio

1983 births
Living people
Sportspeople from Brooklyn
Sportspeople from Staten Island
Players of American football from New York City
American football cornerbacks
American football safeties
Syracuse Orange football players
San Diego Chargers players
New England Patriots players
Kansas City Chiefs players
Curtis High School alumni
Detroit Lions coaches
Miami Dolphins coaches